Ocean is a solo album by  German composer and multi-instrumentalist Stephan Micus recorded in 1986 and released on the ECM label.

Reception
The Allmusic review by Jim Brenholts awarded the album 4 stars stating "Ocean is a set of acoustic ambient performances from Stephan Micus. He uses exotic instruments and techniques that give this disc electronic timbre... The natural sonorities of these devices create vast atmospheres with organic timbres. The soundscapes penetrate and enhance brainwave activity. This great CD will appeal to fans of Robert Rich, Klaus Wiese, and Riley Lee".

Track listing
All compositions by Stephan Micus
 "Part I: Voice, 6 Hammered Dulcimers, Nay" - 8:13 
 "Part II: 4 Sho, Shakuhachi, 3 Bavarian Zithers, 2 Hammered Dulcimers" - 19:20 
 "Part III: 3 Hammered Dulcimers, Shakuhachi" - 15:46 
 "Part IV: Sho Solo" - 7:13 
Recorded at Tonstudio Bauer in Ludwigsburg, West Germany in January 1986

Personnel
Stephan Micus — voice, sho, nay, shakuhachi, Bavarian zither, hammered dulcimer

References

ECM Records albums
Stephan Micus albums
1986 albums
Albums produced by Manfred Eicher